The Women's 200 metre freestyle competition at the 2017 Summer Universiade was held on 24 and 25 August 2017.

Records
Prior to the competition, the existing world and Universiade records were as follows.

The following new records were set during this competition.

Results

Heats 
The heats were held on 24 August at 9:13.

Swim-off

Semifinals
The semifinals were held on 24 August at 19:13.

Semifinal 1

Semifinal 2

Final 
The final was held on 25 August at 19:24.

References

Women's 200 metre freestyle